3709 Polypoites  is a large Jupiter trojan from the Greek camp, approximately  in diameter. The Trojan asteroid was discovered on 14 October 1985, by American astronomer Carolyn Shoemaker at the Palomar Observatory in California, United States, and named after Polypoites from Greek mythology. The dark D-type asteroid belongs to the 50 largest Jupiter trojans. It has a rotation period of 10 hours and possibly a spherical shape.

Orbit and classification 

Polypoites is a dark Jovian asteroid orbiting in the leading Greek camp at Jupiter's  Lagrangian point, 60° ahead of the Gas Giant's orbit in a 1:1 resonance (see Trojans in astronomy). It is also a non-family asteroid in the Jovian background population.

It orbits the Sun at a distance of 4.9–5.6 AU once every 12.00 years (4,381 days; semi-major axis of 5.24 AU). Its orbit has an eccentricity of 0.06 and an inclination of 20° with respect to the ecliptic. The body's observation arc begins at Palomar on 21 September 1985, just three weeks prior to its official discovery observation.

Physical characteristics 

In both the Tholen- and SMASS-like taxonomy of the Small Solar System Objects Spectroscopic Survey (S3OS2), Polypoites is a D-type asteroid. It is also a generically assumed C-type asteroid.

Rotation period 

Between 2010 and 2017, several rotational lightcurves have been obtained from photometric observations by Robert Stevens at the Center for Solar System Studies in California. Analysis of the best-rated lightcurve from April 2016 gave a period of 10.039 hours with a brightness variation of 0.12 magnitude. A low brightness amplitude between 0.12 and 0.18 is also indicative of a rather spherical shape.

These results supersede a period of 43 hours measured at the Calvin–Rehoboth and Calvin College observatories  in 2007.

Diameter and albedo 

Results from space-based surveys diverge significantly: according to the surveys carried out by the Infrared Astronomical Satellite IRAS, the Japanese Akari satellite and the NEOWISE mission of NASA's Wide-field Infrared Survey Explorer, Polypoites measures between 65.30 and 99.09 kilometers in diameter and its surface has an albedo between 0.0452 and 0.087.

The Collaborative Asteroid Lightcurve Link agrees with the results obtained by IRAS (11 observations) and derives a diameter of 99.01 kilometers with an albedo of 0.0413 based on an absolute magnitude of 9.1.

Naming 

This minor planet was named from Greek mythology after the Greek hero Polypoites, who fought during the Trojan War. In a competition among the Greek warriors, he was able to throw an iron meteorite the farthest and won the game against Leonteus, after whom the minor planet 3793 Leonteus is named. On landing, the meteorite formed an impact crater.

The asteroid's name was suggested by Dorothy and Jerome Preston, with the remark, that, had the Shoemakers been present, they would have examined the event closely. The official naming citation was published by the Minor Planet Center on 2 April 1988.

Notes

References

External links 
 Asteroid Lightcurve Database (LCDB), query form (info )
 Dictionary of Minor Planet Names, Google books
 Discovery Circumstances: Numbered Minor Planets (1)-(5000) – Minor Planet Center
 
 

003709
Discoveries by Carolyn S. Shoemaker
Named minor planets
19851014